Lev Ivanovich Medved (18 June 1905 - 22 February 1982) was a Soviet medical worker. He is the founder and former head of the Institute of Ecohygiene and Toxicology. He was a professor of the USSR Academy of Medical Sciences, and Honored Scientist of the Ukrainian SSR (1961).

Career 
 In 1927, he graduated from the Vinnitsa Chemical and Pharmacological Institute (now Vinnytsia National Medical University. N. I. Pirogov).
 In 1939, he graduated from Kiev Medical Institute (now Bogomolets National Medical University).
 From 1941 to 1945, he was director of the Kiev Medical Institute.
 From 1947 to 1952 he was Minister of Health of the Ukrainian SSR.
 In 1964, he started and headed the Institute of Ecohygiene and Toxicology until his death in 1982.

Awards 
 Order of Lenin
 Order of the Red Banner of Labour
 Order of the Red Star
 Order of the Badge of Honour (twice)

References

External links
  Institute of Ecological Hygiene and Toxicology "L. I. Medved"

1905 births
1982 deaths
Place of birth missing
Academicians of the USSR Academy of Medical Sciences
Bogomolets National Medical University alumni
Recipients of the Order of Lenin
Recipients of the Order of the Red Banner of Labour
Recipients of the Order of the Red Star